The European Cup is an annual baseball tournament, sanctioned and created by the Confederation of European Baseball (CEB). The tournament features the top teams of the professional baseball leagues in Europe.

Starting in 2008, the tournament is now held in two locations. The best two teams from each tournament then compete in the European Champion Cup "Final Four", with the winner receiving the European Champion Cup.

Between 2013 and 2015, the "Final Four" format was replaced with a best-of-three series between the winners of each tournament. In the 2015 tournament, six teams competed in the Paris group, while six other teams competed in Rotterdam. The best two teams then competed in the "Final Four" in Italy, in a best-of-three series, for the championship.

From 2016, a new format has been introduced with an 8-team tournament and three tournaments for lower-level teams, the CEB Cup, the Federations Cup and the Federations Cup qualifiers.

Results

Most Championships

See also
 European Baseball Championship
 Asia Series
 Latin American Series
 Caribbean Series

References

External links
European Cup archive
European Cup Official web site

  
International baseball competitions in Europe
Recurring sporting events established in 1963
WBSC Europe competitions